Kosh-Köl  (or Кош-Коль) is a village in the Issyk-Kul Region of Kyrgyzstan. The village name has also been transliterated as Kosh-Kël' or Kosh-Kel'. It is part of the Issyk-Kul District. Its population was 588 in 2021.

It is located near the northern shore of Lake Issyk Kul between Balykchy and Cholpon-Ata. The village includes two built-up areas. First, the actual residential village, located along the Balykchy-Cholpon-Ata-Karakol highway, as it  cuts across the base of a Koshkol promontory jutting into Lake Issyk Kul; this section is within a couple kilometers away from the lake shore. Second, the name Koshkol' is also applied to the resort strip to the south of the village, on the south-eastern shore of the peninsula. Most of the resort buildings there are decidedly Soviet-era; as of 2007, some of them appeared abandoned, while others received visitors.

Gallery

References

External links 

Populated places in Issyk-Kul Region